King Snake (Sir Edmund Dorrance) is a character appearing in media published by DC Comics, usually as an adversary of Robin (Tim Drake) and Batman. Created by writer Chuck Dixon and artist Tom Lyle, King Snake first appeared in Robin #2 (1991). He is a master martial artist and the father of the villain Bane.

Fictional character biography
Sir Edmund Dorrance, a.k.a. King Snake, is a British native who first distinguished himself in the Royal Artillery (a corps of the British Army). He and some friends then became mercenaries, offering their professional expertise to various anti-communist rebels, and made considerable money in doing so. While in Santa Prisca working with local rebels, his camp was taken by surprise by government commandos and Edmund was blinded by gunfire. He fled the country, leaving for dead a female rebel with whom he had slept with. The woman was actually alive and pregnant with Edmund's son. Both she and her child were imprisoned for Edmund's crimes against the Santa Prisca government, with the child growing up in prison to become the villainous Bane.

Edmund subsequently moved to Hong Kong and used the money he had acquired to start a double life. To the public, he was a Hong Kong businessman worth millions, with interests in shipping, banking, and electronics, while in secret he was one of the most feared men in Asia, a giant in the heroin trade. Taking on the name King Snake (after a snake known for its immunity to other snakes' venom and for eating them), he found willing soldiers in the Ghost Dragon Chinese youth gang of Macau, Kowloon, and Hong Kong. Although he had a strong power base in Hong Kong, he could not hope to stay when the island was handed over to China. He began extending his interests into France and the United States. A jingoistic man, he felt that Hong Kong had been made into a great city purely due to British influence, and decided to lay waste to the city rather than have it be soiled by falling into Chinese hands. His plans to release a Nazi-developed plague after leaving Hong Kong were foiled by Robin (Tim Drake). At the time, Tim was working with former DEA agent Clyde Rawlins, and the deadly martial artist Lady Shiva. The United States had attempted to stop Sir Edmund's expansion into America, to no avail. Edmund had killed Rawlins' family in retaliation, and Rawlins himself went rogue to pursue King Snake outside the law. Lady Shiva, meanwhile, sought King Snake because he was rumored to be the deadliest male martial artist in the world, and she wished to face him in battle. They eventually stormed King Snake's skyscraper headquarters and defeated him, though Rawlins died in the attempt and Shiva mostly watched the proceedings. Robin knocked Sir Edmund out a window, and Shiva ordered Robin to kill King Snake while he hung from the building. Robin refused to do so and left, believing Edmund was dead. Presumably, Shiva either let Edmund fall or else threw him off the ledge of the building to die. King Snake actually landed on a parapet. Shiva examined him, and, satisfied that he had broken his back and was thus no longer a threat, left him.

After having his spine reinforced and regaining his mobility, Sir Edmund moved to Gotham, where he wrested control of the Chinatown district away from the Triad gangs, revealing himself to be alive, and initially focusing on Robin for revenge (although his memories of the battle in Hong Kong were muddled, he eventually remembered that it was Lady Shiva that was most responsible for his defeat there, although he still remained hostile to Robin). King Snake also begins his feud with Batman after he defeated him in combat. Not long after, however, he lost power in a gang war, with his own Ghost Dragons rebelling and the Triad gangs sending assassins (such as the Silver Monkey of the Brotherhood of the Fist) after him.

King Snake survived and joined the international terrorist cult Kobra. He took advantage of a leadership struggle in that organization, with the previous "Lord Naja-Naja" disgraced, and Danny Temple (a friend of Robin's) was revealed to be the next in line for leadership.  Temple was abducted and taken to a mountain lair of the cult. During the ceremony intended to invest Temple with leadership, however, King Snake rebelled, declared himself the next Naja-Naja, and his followers healed his eyes in a Lazarus Pit the cult has access to (which could only be opened by Temple, explaining Sir Edmund's subterfuge). His eyesight restored, Sir Edmund battled against Robin (who was attempting to rescue Danny Temple), while Kobra (the prior leader of the cult) attempted to regain control of the cult. Luckily for Robin, Sir Edmund was unaccustomed to seeing, actually throwing his fighting style off. A vial of cobra poison used in the Kobra-cult initiation ceremony was knocked over, and in his attempts to warn King Snake, Robin accidentally caused the villain to be blinded a second time. Robin and Danny Temple escaped, while King Snake was left trapped in the base with no escape.

After a significant amount of time, the villain Bane finally learned the identity of his father and tracked King Snake down to the mountain base. Sir Edmund had survived months alone, and was barely alive and severely malnourished. Bane was emotionally conflicted during the reunion, and apparently intended to kill his father several times, but did not. King Snake tried once more to seize control of the Kobra Cult, this time with his son at his side. After Robin and Batman intervened, however, Bane sided with them. In the resulting struggle, King Snake was knocked down a deep crevice, apparently dying.

During the 2009 - 2010 "Blackest Night" storyline, King Snake is among the many deceased villains that receive a black power ring and is reanimated into a Black Lantern. Included are the Trigger Twins and Magpie. He takes a leadership role among the Black Lanterns, coordinating Black Lantern strikes throughout Gotham City.

King Snake is alive once again post the "DC Rebirth" reboot. He is one of the many villains taken down by Batman and Catwoman after he takes her along with him on an average night of his job.

Powers and abilities
The King Snake has no superhuman powers. However, he is a master of several of the world's most deadly martial arts. He kills without conscience and has earned the title of "the most dangerous man alive". The King Snake is also blind but has made it an asset rather than a handicap, as he has honed all of his other senses to an uncanny degree, that even Batman had difficulty overcoming King Snake without aids  during their first encounter. He uses the dark as his weapon, and has become so used to fighting in the dark that he was actually less effective as a combatant when his vision was briefly restored by a Lazarus Pit, allowing Robin to defeat him in the subsequent struggle.

In other media
While King Snake does not appear in the Fox series Gotham, he is alluded to in the fifth and final season. In this version, Bane (portrayed by Shane West) is given the real name Eduardo Dorrance, a reference to Edmund Dorrance, who was his father in the original comics.
King Snake appears in Batman: Soul of the Dragon, voiced by Patrick Seitz. This version is a member of the Kobra cult, and in the film's climax fights and is killed by Richard Dragon.

See also
 List of Batman family enemies

References

Characters created by Chuck Dixon
Comics characters introduced in 1991
DC Comics male supervillains
DC Comics martial artists
DC Comics supervillains
Fictional blind characters
Fictional mercenaries in comics
Fictional drug dealers
Fictional English people